The name Blythe ( or ) derives from Old English bliþe ("joyous, kind, cheerful, pleasant"; modern blithe), and further back from Proto-Germanic *blithiz ("gentle, kind").

People
Blythe (given name), including a list of people named Blythe
Blythe (surname), including a list of people with the surname Blythe

Places
Blythe, California, United States
Blythe, Georgia, United States
Blythe Township, Schuylkill County, Pennsylvania, United States
Blythe Bay, Antarctica
Blythe River, river in New Zealand
Blythe River (Tasmania), river in Tasmania, Australia
River Blithe, Staffordshire, United Kingdom
River Blythe, Warwickshire, United Kingdom
Blythe Hill Fields, London, United Kingdom
Blythe Bridge, Staffordshire, United Kingdom

Other
Blythe (doll)

See also
Blithe (disambiguation)
Blyth (disambiguation)
Blyth River (Northern Territory)
River Blyth (disambiguation)